The  opened in Yasugi, Shimane Prefecture, Japan in 1970. It houses a collection of modern Japanese art, including paintings by Taikan Yokoyama, and has a celebrated garden.

Its six gardens and around 1,500 exhibits of Japanese paintings, pottery, and other works of art occupy the 165,000 square-meter area. Adachi Museum of Art earned the top rating of three stars in Michelin Green Guide Japan because of its elegance.

In April 2020, the museum opened a separate hall dedicated to the works of Kitaoji Rosanjin.

Gallery

See also
Japanese gardens

References

External links

  Adachi Museum of Art (homepage)
   (homepage)
Virtual tour of the Adachi Museum of Art provided by Google Arts & Culture

Museums in Shimane Prefecture
Art museums and galleries in Japan
Art museums established in 1970
1970 establishments in Japan
Gardens in Shimane Prefecture